Csanád Gémesi (born 13 November 1986) is a Hungarian right-handed sabre fencer, 2018 team European champion, and 2021 team Olympic bronze medalist.

Career
Gémesi won a bronze medal in the 2003 Cadet World Championships in Trapani. In 2013, he took part in his first World Championships, which were held that year in Hungary. He reached the quarter-finals, where he was defeated by team-mate and reigning Olympic champion Áron Szilágyi. The next season, he climbed his first World Cup podium with a silver medal in Madrid. On his first participation to European Championships, he made his way to the semi-finals. He was defeated by reigning World champion Veniamin Reshetnikov and came away with a bronze medal. In the World Championships in Kazan, he was eliminated in the first round by team Olympic champion Oh Eun-seok. In the team event, Hungary were defeated by Italy in the semi-finals, but prevailed over Russia to take the bronze medal.

Medal Record

Olympic Games

World Championship

European Championship

Grand Prix

World Cup

References

External links

Profile at the European Fencing Confederation

Hungarian male sabre fencers
Universiade medalists in fencing
People from Gödöllő
1986 births
Living people
Universiade bronze medalists for Hungary
Medalists at the 2009 Summer Universiade
Fencers at the 2020 Summer Olympics
Medalists at the 2020 Summer Olympics
Olympic medalists in fencing
Olympic fencers of Hungary
Olympic bronze medalists for Hungary
Sportspeople from Pest County
World Fencing Championships medalists